Nazia Sadiq (born 7 August 1976) is a Pakistani former cricketer who played as a right-handed batter and occasional wicket-keeper. She appeared in one Test match, nine One Day Internationals and three Twenty20 Internationals for Pakistan between 1997 and 2009. She played domestic cricket for Lahore and Zarai Taraqiati Bank Limited.

She holds the record for the longest interval between appearances in WODI history, at 11 years and 41 days, setting the record when she returned to play in 2009 against Ireland, with her last appearance being in 1998.

References

External links
 
 

1976 births
Living people
Place of birth missing (living people)
Pakistan women Test cricketers
Pakistan women One Day International cricketers
Lahore women cricketers
Zarai Taraqiati Bank Limited women cricketers